Jonathon Edward Lyons (born 1951 in Leeds) is a British-Canadian businessman and is the owner and chairman of JE London Properties.

Biography
Lyons is the youngest son of the financier Isidore Jack Lyons, (Sir Jack Lyons CBE)  a former director of the UDS Group. Jonathon Lyons made his fortune in the property and venture capital sectors as well as retail,He had large investments in the middle east Overseas Director (Ronson PLC and Remington) in the distribution licensing sector. Appointed director of Regentflag Limited in February 1990, JLC (London) LTD, appointed director Feb 1990 also director South Bank Pension Fund Trustees Limited on 28 February 1990. Appointed director of J E London Properties Limited 31 Dec 1991. Appointed Director of Bellcrown Estates LTD (dissolved) 5 February 1998. Appointed director of 37 Colville Terreace Management Company Limited, Switzerland.  A large proportion of the Lyons family holdings stretch across many freeholds within and around the Notting Hill and Kensington areas as well as large property holdings in the United States.

Lyons counts King Abdullah of Jordan as one of his friends, and he was a former friend and adviser to the late King Hussein of Jordan. He was a major donor to the Conservative Party (UK) and to various arts and music charities through the Sir Jack Lyons Charitable Trust, of which he was a trustee.  He continues to collect art  as well as important classic cars. Lyons has successfully completed competitive classic car events such as London-Cape Town, Liege-Rome-Liege, Monte Carlo Classic, Copa Milano San remo, Lands End to John O’Groats,  Mila Miglia and many others, most recently the Samurai Challenge.

Following his extensive rally experience, Lyons founded The Jewel Events, which has led him to organise events with classic cars all over the world. Amongst them are various locations in Europe, Jordan, China, South Africa, Cuba, Argentina, Chile, New Zealand, Switzerland, and The Alpes Maritimes.

Lyons has been since 2003, and continues to be, a resident of Switzerland.

Lyons divorced Miriam Lyons née Djanogly, sister of textile maker Sir Harry Djanogly CBE, in 2010. There are three children.

References

1951 births
Living people
Businesspeople from Leeds
British Jews
Conservative Party (UK) donors